Raphael David Thomaz (born 21 April 1993), commonly known as Raphinha, is a Brazilian professional footballer who plays as a defender for .

Career statistics

References

External links

Living people
1993 births
Footballers from Porto Alegre
Brazilian footballers
Association football defenders
Campeonato Brasileiro Série A players
Campeonato Brasileiro Série B players
Campeonato Brasileiro Série C players
Campeonato Brasileiro Série D players
Sport Club Internacional players
Luverdense Esporte Clube players
Bangu Atlético Clube players
Ypiranga Futebol Clube players